The Royal Swedish Academy of Engineering Sciences or Kungliga Ingenjörsvetenskapsakademien (IVA), founded on 24 October 1919 by King Gustaf V, is one of the royal academies in Sweden. The academy is an independent organisation, which promotes contact and exchange between business, research, and government, in Sweden and internationally. It is the world's oldest academy of engineering sciences.(OECD Reviews of Innovation Policy: Sweden 2012).

Leadership
The King is the patron of the Academy.
The following people have been presidents of IVA since its foundation in 1919:
1919–1940: Axel F. Enström
1941–1959: Edy Velander
1960–1970: Sven Brohult
1971–1982: Gunnar Hambraeus
1982–1994: Hans G. Forsberg
1995–2000: Kurt Östlund
1999–2001: (temporary) Enrico Deiaco
2001–2008: Lena Treschow Torell
2008–2017: Björn O. Nilsson
2017–2023: Tuula Teeri

Academy member 
Each year, outstanding scientists and engineers from universities and industries are elected into membership of IVA. Currently, the academy has 1000 Swedish and 300 foreign members. Foreign members are non-resident and non-citizen of Sweden. All new members are nominated by existing members.

Focus areas 
The academy focuses on twelve areas of engineering sciences:

 Mechanical Engineering
 Electrical Engineering
 Building and Construction
 Chemical Engineering
 Mining and Materials
 Management
 Basic and Interdisciplinary Engineering Sciences
 Forest Technology
 Economics
 Biotechnology
 Education and Research Policy
 Information Technology

Each focus area is addressed by a committee with a representative chair.

Awards
The academy awards several prizes, medals and scholarships:
Large Gold Medal (since 1924)
 Gold Medal (since 1921)
 Brinell medal (Brinellmedaljen, since 1936, and named after Johan August Brinell) 
 Gold Plaque (since 1951)
 Honorary Sign (since 1919)
 Axel F. Enstrom Medal (1959–1981)
 Prize for science in journalism (since 2015) 
 Hans Werthén Fonden
 The King Carl XVI Gustafs 50-years-old Foundation

See also
 List of Swedish scientists
 Royal Academy of Engineering, UK
 Royal Swedish Academy of Sciences, Sweden
 Spanish Royal Academy of Sciences, Spain
 National Academy of Engineering, USA

References

External links
The Royal Swedish Academy of Engineering Sciences

1919 establishments in Sweden
Engineering Sciences
Science and technology in Sweden
National academies of engineering